Charlie and the Chocolate Factory: The Ride was a dark ride located in the Cloud Cuckoo Land area of Alton Towers theme park, Staffordshire, England. It was based upon the famous 1964 Roald Dahl book of the same name, and took its thematic inspiration from the illustrations of Quentin Blake. The ride closed at the end of the 2015 season and was replaced by the Alton Towers Dungeon in 2019.

History
The building originally housed Around the World in 80 Days and later Toyland Tours, though the original layout was shortened when redeveloped into Charlie And The Chocolate Factory. Mack Rides, who had engineered the original ride hardware in 1981, returned to add a new offload point towards the end of the ride, allowing guests to move into the new simulator ending.

The attraction was closed at the end of 2015. The building and associated boat ride were re-themed into The Alton Towers Dungeon, which opened in 2019.

Various theming object from the ride were put on sale at auction on 13 February 2019 to raise money for Merlin's Magic Wand.

Ride
The ride was split into two segments, the first being a boat ride along the chocolate river inside Willy Wonka's Chocolate Factory. Passengers encountered all the characters from the book (going from Augustus Gloop to Veruca Salt) as either simple animatronics or CGI projections. After disembarking the boats the second segment began with a short pre-show video (involving Mike Teavee). The video was presented in a way that made it look like as if the viewers were actually trapped within the TV set. The ride continued inside one of the two "Great Glass Elevators" which simulated passengers taking an airborne trip through the rest of the factory. Each elevator was a static room with semi-translucent walls and ceiling on which CGI animations were projected from the outside, and only the floor slightly trembled to give the impression of movement.

References

External links
Charlie And The Chocolate Factory: The Ride at TowersStreet
Charlie And The Chocolate Factory: The Ride at TowersTimes
Charlie and the Chocolate Factory: The Ride at Towers Nerd
Charlie and the Chocolate Factory: The Ride at Alton Towers Almanac
Charlie and the Chocolate Factory: The Ride at darkrides.co.uk
Charlie and the Chocolate Factory: The Ride at ThemeParks-UK

Ride
Dark rides
Amusement rides introduced in 2006
Amusement rides that closed in 2015
2006 establishments in the United Kingdom
2015 disestablishments in the United Kingdom
Water rides manufactured by Mack Rides
Water rides
Alton Towers